Cleo Springs (originally known as Cleo) is a town in Major County, Oklahoma, United States. The population was 326 at the 2000 census.

Description
The post office was established March 21, 1894 and discontinued May 3, 1917. The Sod House Museum, which is listed on the National Register of Historic Places and also an Oklahoma Historic site, is located north of town in Alfalfa County.

Geography
Cleo Springs is located at  (36.404703, -98.441168).

Eagle Chief Creek, which empties into the Cimarron River near Cleo Springs, was known to the Cheyenne people as Maheonekamax.

Demographics

As of the census of 2000, there were 326 people, 135 households, and 90 families residing in the town. There were 153 housing units at an average density of 272.3 per square mile (105.5/km2). The racial makeup of the town was 98.16% White, 1.53% African American, and 0.31% from two or more races. Hispanic or Latino people of any race were 0.31% of the population.

There were 135 households, out of which 31.1% had children under the age of 18 living with them, 59.3% were married couples living together, 5.9% had a female householder with no husband present, and 32.6% were non-families. 31.1% of all households were made up of individuals, and 16.3% had someone living alone who was 65 years of age or older. The average household size was 2.41 and the average family size was 3.01.

In the town, the population was spread out, with 23.3% under the age of 18, 11.3% from 18 to 24, 22.7% from 25 to 44, 27.3% from 45 to 64, and 15.3% who were 65 years of age or older. The median age was 40 years. For every 100 females, there were 87.4 males. For every 100 females age 18 and over, there were 88.0 males.

The median income for a household in the town was $31,250, and the median income for a family was $39,000. Males had a median income of $25,781 versus $15,893 for females. The per capita income for the town was $14,824. About 14.1% of families and 13.9% of the population were below the poverty line, including 2.8% of those under age 18 and 20.8% of those age 65 or over.

See also

 List of cities and towns in Oklahoma

References

External links

 Encyclopedia of Oklahoma History and Culture - Cleo Springs
 Oklahoma Digital Maps: Digital Collections of Oklahoma and Indian Territory

Towns in Major County, Oklahoma
Towns in Oklahoma